List of Romania national rugby union players is a list of people who have played for the Romania national rugby union team. The list only includes players who have played in a match recognized by the Romanian Rugby Federation as a test match, whether it was played before or after the governing body was founded in 1931. (In rugby union, any match of a nation's senior side recognized as a test by its national governing body is included in test statistics for that nation.) Players that were first capped during the same match are listed in order of those that began in the starting line up before replacements and then in alphabetical order by surname. Note that the "position" column lists the position at which the player made his test debut and not necessarily the position for which he is best known. A position in parentheses indicates that the player debuted as a substitute.

Members of the national rugby union team who have been inducted into the World Rugby Hall of Fame include the players from the bronze medal-winning team from the 1924 Olympic Games (inducted in 2012).

List

Notes

References

Lists of international rugby union players by team
Romania international rugby union players
rugby union